Patriots is a 1994 American film, starring Linda Amendola, Mark Newell, Aidan Parkinson. It was written, produced and directed by Frank Kerr.

Plot
An Irish-American girl from Boston spends two hellish weeks in Northern Ireland, after she has been persuaded to help the Irish Republican Army.

Cast
 Linda Amendola as Alexis Shannon
 Mark Newell as Sean McGinnis
 Aidan Parkinson as Damien Ryan
 Dermott Petty as Paddy McClure
 Carmel O'Reilly as Belle McCreesh
 James Conway as Kevin Whitehall

References

External links
 
 
 Patriots at YouTube

1994 films
1994 thriller films
American thriller films
Films about The Troubles (Northern Ireland)
1990s English-language films
1990s American films